John Quigley (1925–2021) is a Scottish author known for his historical novel King's Royal (1975) about the invention of blended whisky in mid-nineteenth century Glasgow. A 1983 BBC television serial was based on the novel.

References

1925 births
2021 deaths
20th-century Scottish writers